Matraca Maria Berg Hanna (born February 3, 1964, in Nashville, Tennessee) is an American country music singer and songwriter. She has released five albums: three for RCA Records, one for Rising Tide Records and one for Dualtone Records, and has charted in the top 40 of the U.S. Billboard country charts with "Baby, Walk On" and "The Things You Left Undone," both at No. 36. Besides most of her own material, Berg has written hits for T.G. Sheppard, Karen Brooks, Trisha Yearwood, Deana Carter, Patty Loveless, Kenny Chesney and others. In 2008 she was inducted into the Nashville Songwriters Hall of Fame and in 2018 she received the Poet's Award from the Academy of Country Music Awards.

Early history
Matraca Maria Berg was born February 3, 1964, in Nashville, Tennessee. Berg's mother, Icie Calloway, moved from Harlan County, Kentucky, to Nashville in the 1960s to seek her fortune as a singer and songwriter shortly before Matraca was born. Matraca's Aunt Sudie Calloway was a successful Music Row backup singer. Aunts Coleida Calloway and Clara Howard were backup vocalists on Kentucky's Renfro Valley Barn Dance. Uncle Jim Baker was a steel guitar player who also spent some time running Mel Tillis's song publishing companies.  When Matraca was 2 years old, her mother married nuclear physicist Ron Berg, who legally adopted Matraca.

Berg's mother found only limited success in the music industry and eventually became a nurse. Berg herself then took up songwriting with her mother's encouragement. When Berg played her songs for songwriter Bobby Braddock, he volunteered to co-write with her. She found her earliest success in their collaboration, "Faking Love", which was sung by Karen Brooks and T. G. Sheppard, topping the Billboard Hot Country Singles (now Hot Country Songs) charts on February 19, 1983.

Career history
After her mother's death in 1985, Berg continued to have great success writing songs for other performers.  Reba McEntire had a No. 1 song with her "The Last One to Know", and Randy Travis, Tanya Tucker, Ray Price, Marie Osmond, Sweethearts of the Rodeo, Michelle Wright and others recorded her songs.

Berg signed to a recording contract with RCA Records Nashville in 1990, releasing her debut album Lying to the Moon that year. Its first two singles, "Baby, Walk On" and "The Things You Left Undone," both charted in the country top 40 at No. 36, followed by the No. 43 "I Got It Bad" and No. 55 "I Must Have Been Crazy."

Matraca was nominated for Top New Female Vocalist by the Academy of Country Music in 1991, losing to Shelby Lynne.

What was to be her follow-up album, Bittersweet Surrender, was recorded in 1991. It featured the single "It's Easy to Tell," which charted in November 1991. The album was rejected by the label, which wanted a more mainstream-sounding recording instead. One of the songs from this canceled album, "Wrong Side of Memphis," later became a Top Ten hit for Trisha Yearwood. She continued to write for others, and in 1994, released a pop album The Speed of Grace.

Berg's 1995 song, "You Can Feel Bad", co-written with Tim Krekel and recorded by Patty Loveless, was a Number 1 country single, spending twenty weeks on the charts.

Berg co-wrote "Strawberry Wine" along with Gary Harrison, which Deana Carter released as a single. Berg won the "Song of the Year" at the 1997 CMA (Country Music Association) Awards. The same year, she released the album Sunday Morning to Saturday Night via Rising Tide Records; it produced the singles "That Train Don't Run" and "Back in the Saddle," the former of which was released by Pinmonkey in 2006. In 1999, RCA released a compilation album entitled Lying to the Moon & Other Stories which also included tracks from her 1997 Rising Tide release.

In 2004 and 2005, Berg was nominated for induction into the Nashville Songwriters Hall of Fame, making her one of the youngest nominees in history. She was eventually inducted in 2008. She continues to be a prolific and respected country songwriter.

Personal life
She currently lives in Nashville with her husband, Jeff Hanna, a founding member of the Nitty Gritty Dirt Band. They were married December 5, 1993. The couple met while touring with Clint Black in the late 1980s.

Discography

Albums

Singles

Music videos

Filmography

Singles written by Berg

References

External links
Official website

1964 births
Living people
American country singer-songwriters
American women country singers
Singers from Nashville, Tennessee
RCA Records Nashville artists
Rising Tide Records artists
Country musicians from Tennessee
Dualtone Records artists
Proper Records artists
Singer-songwriters from Tennessee